The First Lombank Trophy was a motor race, run to Formula One rules, held on 17 September 1960 at Snetterton Motor Racing Circuit, England. The race was run over 37 laps of the circuit, and was won by British driver Innes Ireland in a Lotus 18.

The field included a large number of Formula Two cars.

Results

 A number of other Formula One cars may have been entered for this race but are not confirmed. These were New Zealander George Lawton in a Cooper-Climax, possibly entered by Yeoman Credit Racing; a second Team Thercel entry (#26), a Lotus-Climax driven by British driver Richard Utley; and two Scuderia Eugenio Castellotti Cooper-Ferraris without named drivers.

References

 Results at Silhouet.com 
 "The Grand Prix Who's Who", Steve Small, 1995.

Lombank Trophy
Lombank Trophy
Lombank
Lombank Trophy